The Defence Space Agency (DSA) is a tri-service agency of the Indian Armed Forces. Headquartered in Bengaluru, Karnataka, India. The agency is tasked with operating the space-warfare and Satellite Intelligence assets of India. The DSA draws personnel from all three branches of the Armed Forces.

The agency is expected to be converted into a full sized tri-service military command in the future.

History

Origins 
The Naresh Chandra Task Force was set up in July 2011 by National Security Advisor Shivshankar Menon to review the recommendations of the Kargil Review Committee, assess the implementation progress and further suggest new reforms related to national security. The task force was led by Naresh Chandra, retired Indian Administrative Service officer, and comprised 13other members, including Gopalaswami Parthasarathy, Air Chief Marshal Srinivasapuram Krishnaswamy (Retd), Admiral Arun Prakash (Retd), Lt Gen V. R. Raghavan (Retd), Anil Kakodkar, K C Verma and V K Duggal. The committee conducted the first holistic review of national security since the Kargil Review Committee and submitted its classified report to Prime Minister Manmohan Singh on 23May2012. Among its recommendations, the Task Force recommended the creation of a cyber command, an aerospace command and a special operations command. All three units were proposed to be tri-service commands. The DSA is a downsized implementation of this proposal.

The creation of the Defence Space Agency (DSA), the Defence Cyber Agency (DCA), and the Armed Forces Special Operations Division (AFSOD) was approved by Prime Minister Narendra Modi during the Combined Commanders' Conference at Jodhpur Air Force Station on 28 September 2018. The Defence Imagery Processing and Analysis Centre in Delhi and the Defence Satellite Control Centre in Bhopal were subsumed by the DSA.

Anti-satellite programme of India 

Months before the operationalisation of the Defence Space Agency, India conducted an Anti-satellite weapon (ASAT) test in March 2019. The test was aimed at demonstrating India's anti-satellite capability.

The Indian ASAT programme can be traced back to its BMD program, which began in 1999 in response to threats posed by the Ballistic missiles of Pakistan and China. In 2006 and 2007, India tested its first exo atmospheric interceptor and has developed many interceptors since then. On 18 March 2008, DRDO Chief V. K. Saraswat had hinted that India possessed technology required for an ASAT missile, reiterating it in February 2010. India is known to have been developing an exo-atmospheric kill vehicle that can be integrated with the missile to engage satellites. In April 2012, Saraswat again said that India possessed the critical technologies for an ASAT weapon from radars and interceptors developed for Indian Ballistic Missile Defence Programme. India had begun work on its ASAT soon after the 2007 Chinese anti-satellite missile test.

As of April 2019, India was working on directed energy ASAT weapons, co-orbital ASAT weapons, lasers and electromagnetic pulse (EMP) based ASAT weapons. The ability to protect space assets from hostile electronic and physical attacks was also being developed by India.

Exercise IndSpaceEx 
India conducted its first simulated space warfare exercise on 25th and 26 July 2019, called IndSpaceEx. The exercise was conducted under the supervision of Integrated Defence Staff. The exercise was aimed at obtaining an assessment of threats and the creation of a joint space warfare doctrine.

Organisation 
The DSA will be in Bangalore. It will function under the Integrated Defence Staff. Personnel from all the three branches of the Indian Armed Forces will be stationed in the agency. The agency is expected to be fully operational by November 2019.

Role 
The DSA will operate systems to protect Indian interests in outer space and will deal with potential space wars. The agency will have the responsibility of developing a space warfare strategy. It works on Signals Intelligence (SIGINT), Electronic Intelligence (ELINT), Communication Intelligence (COMINT) and in areas like space-based tracking systems.

Defence Space Research Agency 
The Defence Space Research Agency (DSRA) is the scientific organisation responsible for developing space-warfare systems and technologies for the Defence Space Agency. The DSRA was approved by the Government of India in June 2019. The DSRA is composed of scientists who undertake research and development in close coordination with the Integrated Defence Staff. Various types of Anti-satellite weapon systems are currently under development.

See also 
 Space Force
 Integrated entities 
 Defence Planning Committee, tri-services command at policy level with NSA as its chief
 Defence Cyber Agency, tri-services command 
 Integrated Defence Staff, tri-services command at strategic level composed of MoD, MEA and tri-services staff
 Integrated Theatre Command
 Armed Forces Special Operations Division, tri-services command at operational level part of Integrated Defence Staff
 Indian Nuclear Command Authority
 Strategic Forces Command

 Foreign Assets 
 India's overseas military bases

 Other nations
 Special Operations Forces Command (KSSO) - Russian equivalent command
 Joint Special Operations Command (JSOC) - U.S. equivalent command

 General concepts
 Joint warfare, general concept
 Minimum Credible Deterrence

References 

Military units and formations of India
Joint military units and formations of India
2018 establishments in Karnataka
 
Government agencies established in 2018